Aalorukkam is a 2018 Malayalam–language Indian film directed by debutant V C Abhilash starring Indrans in the lead role of the protagonist, an Ottan Thullal exponent.

The film won the National Film Award for Best Film on Other Social Issues while Indrans won the Kerala State Film Award for Best Actor for his widely acclaimed performance in the film.

Plot

Aalorukkam portrays the struggles of Ottan Thullal exponent Pappu Pisharody, initially in search of his missing son, and later, struggling to accept her as she is.

Cast
 Indrans as Pappu Pisharody
 Srikanth Menon as Transgender Priyanka
 Shaji AJ as Raja
 Vishnu Agasthya
 Sajith Venugopalan Nambiar
 Sameera
 Sreeshma Vijayan
 Sajitha Saawariya
 Baby Threya
 Deepak Jayaprakashan

References

External links

2018 films
2010s Malayalam-language films
Best Film on Other Social Issues National Film Award winners